Adiembra is a village in the Western North Region of Ghana.

History
Adiembra was historically home to a Jewish community from the House of Israel. The House of Israel were not accepted by the Christians of Adiembra, who violently persecuted them and imprisoned their leaders. Most of the House of Israel fled Adiembra and settled in nearby Sefwi Wiawso, establishing the neighborhood of New Adiembra.

Adiembra is home to the non-profit environmentalist organization Friends of the Nation.

See also
History of the Jews in Ghana

References 

Historic Jewish communities in West Africa
House of Israel (Ghana)
Populated places in the Western Region (Ghana)